Dust and Dreams is the eleventh studio album by Camel. Released in 1991 after a seven-year hiatus during which Andrew Latimer and Susan Hoover moved from England to California to set up their own Camel Productions label, the album was inspired by John Steinbeck's The Grapes of Wrath.

Track listings
All songs were written by Andrew Latimer, except where noted.
"Dust Bowl" – 1:54
"Go West" – 3:42
"Dusted Out" – 1:35
"Mother Road" – 4:15
"Needles" – 2:34
"Rose of Sharon" (Susan Hoover, Latimer) – 4:48
"Milk n' Honey" – 3:30
"End of the Line" (Hoover, Latimer) – 6:52
"Storm Clouds" – 2:06
"Cotton Camp" – 2:55
"Broken Banks" – 0:34
"Sheet Rain" – 2:14
"Whispers" – 0:52
"Little Rivers and Little Rose" – 1:56
"Hopeless Anger" – 4:57
"Whispers in the Rain" – 2:56

Personnel
 Andy Latimer – Guitar, Flute, Keyboards, Vocals, Producer, Engineer
 Colin Bass – Bass
 Ton Scherpenzeel – Keyboards
 Paul Burgess – Drums

Additional musicians
 Don Harriss – Keyboards
 Christopher Bock – Drums
 Kim Venaas – Harmonica (5,7,12), Timpani (16)
 David Paton – Vocal (6)
 Mae McKenna – Vocal (6)
 John Burton – French Horn (12)
 James SK Wān – bamboo flute
 Neil Panton – Oboe (13)

Other credits
Produced & engineered by Andy Latimer
Mixed by Bruce Lampcov at Air Studios, London
Artwork by Emily Mura-Smith

Charts

References

 The Rough Guide to Rock. (2003). United Kingdom: Rough Guides. p.165

External links

1991 albums
Camel (band) albums
Concept albums
The Grapes of Wrath
Music based on novels
Adaptations of works by John Steinbeck